Anubrata is an Indian masculine given name. Notable people with the name include:

 Anubrata Basu (born 1989), Bengali film actor
 Anubrata Chatterjee (born 1984), Indian tabla player

Masculine given names
Asian given names